Vaughn is an unincorporated community in Lane County, Oregon, United States. Author Ralph Friedman described Vaughn as "a mill in the meadows".

History
Vaughn was established in the 1920s by the Snellstrom Brothers Lumber Company. The company town was later owned by the Long-Bell Lumber Company, then sold to International Paper (IP) in the mid-1950s. Vaughn is near the route of Coos Bay Rail Link (formerly the Central Oregon and Pacific Railroad Coos Bay Line, once a branch of the Southern Pacific Railroad). On a 1930 map the community is shown on the property of Roland Vaughn. Because the railroad makes a horseshoe bend and misses the community, the railroad's Vaughn Station is about a mile west of there.

Today Vaughn is the site of a Rosboro Lumber Company laminated beam plant that was purchased from Weyerhaeuser in 2005. The beam plant was built by Bohemia, Inc. in 1988. Bohemia also ran a plywood plant at Vaughn, which it had purchased from International Paper in 1982 after IP closed it; Bohemia reopened the mill in 1983. The plywood plant was closed temporarily in 1985 after a section of the roof collapsed.

References

Company towns in Oregon
Unincorporated communities in Lane County, Oregon
1920s establishments in Oregon
Unincorporated communities in Oregon